Jazz is a 1992 historical novel by Pulitzer and Nobel Prize-winning American author Toni Morrison. The majority of the narrative takes place in Harlem during the 1920s; however, as the pasts of the various characters are explored, the narrative extends back to the mid-19th-century American South.

The novel forms the second part of Morrison's Dantesque trilogy on African-American history, beginning with Beloved (1987) and ending with Paradise (1997).

Legacy
Jazz was Morrison’s most recently published work when she was awarded the 1993 Nobel Prize for Literature. In the novel, "Morrison uses a device which is akin to the way jazz itself is played… The result is a richly complex, sensuously conveyed image of the events, the characters and moods."

Characters
 Joe Trace, a door-to-door cosmetics salesman and the murderer of his young lover.
 Violet Trace, an unlicensed beautician. Violet is married to Joe. She is nicknamed "Violent" because she assaulted the corpse of Joe’s lover with a knife at the funeral.
 Dorcas, Joe's young lover, who is shot down at a party. Dorcas is inspired by a picture from The Harlem Book of the Dead (a collection of funeral photographs by James Van Der Zee).
 Alice Manfred, Dorcas' aunt and guardian. A conservative Christian ashamed by her niece's behavior. Alice enters into an unusual friendship with Violet.
 Felice, a friend of Dorcas' who goes to the Trace household in search of answers.
 Golden Gray,  a mixed race man from the 19th century. Golden appears in both Joe's and Violet's histories.

References

1992 American novels
Alfred A. Knopf books
Fiction with unreliable narrators
Harlem in fiction
Novels set in Manhattan
Southern United States in fiction
Historical novels
Novels by Toni Morrison
Novels set in the 1920s
African-American novels